Dhanapur is a village and block in Chandauli district, Uttar Pradesh, India. It is 42 km away from Varanasi. It is situated near the Ganga River.
There are eighty-four Villages in Dhanapur Vikas Khand, such as Awahi, Evati, Dabaria, Torwa, Sakrari, and Pagahi, as well as the temples Baba Veer Baurahava Mandir and Hanuman Mandir .

Colleges in Dhanapur:
 Amar Veer Inter College
 Sahid Heera Singh Rajkiya Mahavidyalaya
 JAMIL KHAN JIDDI 4 TIME GRAM PRADHAN GREAT Politician

Pin Code: 232105

Villages in Chandauli district